Oki's Movie is a 2010 South Korean drama film written and directed by Hong Sang-soo.

In a multipart narrative divided into four chapters, Hong fashions a new kind of love triangle. Oki is a young and beautiful college student majoring in film production and torn between the affections of two men: an older cinema professor and a former student/budding filmmaker. As the story shifts perspectives and timelines, Hong depicts each relationship with the authentically awkward rhythms of real life.

Plot 
A Day for Incantation: In Seoul, winter, the present day. On his way to a screening of one of his films, struggling shorts director Nam Jin-gu (Lee Sun-kyun) is nagged by his wife Jang Su-yang (Seo Yeong-hwa) about his drinking, and he wonders if she is having an affair with a guy called Yeong-su. Nam's onetime professor at film school, Song (Moon Sung-keun), tells him that filmmaking as an art is now dead. At a dinner with film-school staff, Nam gets drunk and into a quarrel with Song, about whom he's heard a disquieting rumor. Afterwards, at the Q&A for his film, Nam is asked by a member of the audience (Lee Chae-eun) whether it's true he was dating the actress at the time and is therefore responsible for ruining her life. Nam says he has quit directing.

King of Kisses: Some years earlier, Nam sees fellow student Jung Ok-heui (Jung Yu-mi) at film school and tries to go out with her, claiming he's never dated a woman before. When they smooch in a greenhouse, she says he's a good kisser. She's still getting over a relationship with an older man but finally gives in to Nam's persistence, and they sleep together and date.

After the Snowstorm: Following a heavy bout of snow, only Nam and Jung turn up one day for Prof. Song's class, and the three end up talking about relationships. Song has already decided to quit teaching.

Oki's Movie: Jung narrates her own short movie based on her relationships with two guys, an "older man" and a "younger man", with whom she separately went walking with one winter on Mt. Acha, south of Seoul.

References

External links 
  
 
 
 

2010 films
2010 romantic drama films
South Korean independent films
South Korean romantic drama films
Adultery in films
Films about film directors and producers
Films about educators
Films set in Seoul
Films shot in Seoul
Films directed by Hong Sang-soo
Sponge Entertainment films
2010s Korean-language films
2010 independent films
2010s South Korean films